George Elias Khoury (1983 - March 19, 2004) was an Israeli Arab Christian murdered by a Palestinian terrorist while jogging in the neighborhood of French Hill in Jerusalem.  Khoury, son of Elias Khoury, a prominent lawyer, was a law student at the Hebrew University of Jerusalem. 
 
The Al Aqsa Martyrs Brigade, the military branch of the Fatah movement, claimed responsibility for the attack. According to the New York Times, the "Palestinian gunman mistook him for a Jew." Khoury's father said, "I am against all violent attacks against innocent civilians whether it be against Israeli civilians or Palestinian civilians."

Fatah apologized and offered to declare him a martyr for the Palestinian cause. Ibrahim Kandalaft, Arafat's adviser on Christian affairs, eulogized Khoury on behalf of the PA chairman, describing him as a shaheed (martyr) of the Palestinian cause. But the victim's mother interrupted him by declaring that her son was an "angel, not a shaheed."

George's grandfather, Daoud Khoury, was also assassinated in an attack in Jerusalem, when a booby-trapped refrigerator exploded at Zion Square.

Khoury was buried in the Christian cemetery on Mount Zion.

References

External links
 Intelligence and Terrorism Information Center: Fatah Al-Aqsa Martyrs' Brigades Murder Israeli Arab Student in Jerusalem
 Maariv International: Al Aqsa Brigades kill Israeli Arab they thought was Jewish
 Memorial page at Israeli Ministry of Foreign Affairs
The Palestinians' genocide campaign By Alan Dershowitz April 18, 2004

1983 births
2004 deaths
Eastern Orthodox Christians from Palestine
Israeli Arab Christians
Israeli casualties in the Second Intifada
Israeli murder victims
Palestinian Christians
People from Jerusalem
People murdered in Israel
Terrorism deaths in Jerusalem
Terrorist incidents in Jerusalem in the 2000s
Terrorist incidents in Asia in 2004